Petrov or Petroff (masculine) or Petrova (feminine), is one of the most common surnames in Russia and Bulgaria. The surname is derived from the first name Pyotr (Пётр, Russian) or Petar (Петър, Bulgarian) (Slavic forms of the Greek name of the Christian apostle, in English Peter) and literally means Pyotr's or Petar's.

Notable people
It is the last name of, among many others, the following people:

Alexander Petrov
Alexander Petrov (chess player) (1794–1867), Russian chess player, after whom the following is named:
Petrov's Defence, an opening
Aleksandr Petrov (animator) (b. 1957), Russian animator

Alexey Petrov
Aleksei Aleksandrovich Petrov (b. 1974), Russian weightlifter
Aleksei Zinovyevich Petrov (1910–1972), Russian mathematician
Aleksey Petrov (ice hockey), Russian ice hockey player with SKA St. Petersburg
Aleksei Petrov (cycling), Soviet cyclist who won bronze medal at the 1960 Olympics
Alexey A Petrov (b. 1971), American physicist
Alyaksey Pyatrow (b. 1991), Belarusian footballer

Andrey Petrov (1930–2006), Russian composer
Antonina Petrova (1915–1941) partisan and Heroine of the Soviet Union
Boris Petrov
Borislava Petrova, Bulgarian curler
Božo Petrov (b. 1979), Croatian politician
Daniel Petrov (b. 1971), Bulgarian boxer

Dmitry Petrov
Dmitry Petrov (translator) (b. 1958), multilingual Russian interpreter, translator, methodologist in foreign language teaching, Polyglot TV show teacher
Dmitry Petrov (sprinter), a Russian sprinter
Dzmitry Pyatrow, a Belarusian footballer

Dušan Petrov, Serbian political and human rights activist
Evdokia Petrova (1915–2002), Soviet spy, wife of the Soviet diplomat who defected to Australia
Galina Petrova (1920–1943), medic and Heroine of the Soviet Union
Georgi Petrov, several people
Gjorche Petrov (1864/1865–1921), Bulgarian revolutionary
Grigory Spiridonovich Petrov (1866-1925), Russian priest and publicist
Igor Petrov
Igor Petrov (1933-2020), Soviet and Russian naval officer
Ihor Petrov (b. 1964), Soviet and Ukrainian football player and coach
Ivailo Petrov (1923–2005), Bulgarian writer
Ivan Petrov
Ivan Petrov (baritone) (1899–1963), opera singer (baritone) of Bulgarian descent
Ivan Atanassov Petrov (b. 1947), Bulgarian neurologist
Ivan Ivanovich Petrov (1920–2003), Russian bass opera singer
Ivan Yefimovich Petrov (1896–1958), Soviet general
Ivanka Petrova (1951–2007), Bulgarian shot putter
Kamelia Petrova (born 2006), Bulgarian rhythmic gymnast
Kirill Petrov (b. 1990), Russian ice hockey player
Konstantin Petrov, Ukrainian physicist
Kuzma Petrov-Vodkin (1878–1939), Russian/Soviet painter
Kyrylo Petrov (b. 1990), Ukrainian footballer
Lyudmila Petrova (b. 1968), Russian long-distance runner
Maya Petrova (b. 1982), Russian Olympic champion in handball
Maria Petrova
Maria Petrova (rhythmic gymnast) (b. 1975), Bulgarian rhythmic gymnast
Maria Petrova (figure skater) (b. 1977), Russian figure skater
Martin Petrov (b. 1979), Bulgarian footballer
Mikhail Petrovich Petrov
Mikhail Petrovich Petrov (general)  (18981941), Soviet general
Mikhail Petrovich Petrov (colonel), Hero of the Soviet Union
Nadia Petrova (b. 1982), Russian professional tennis player
Nikolay Petrov, multiple people
Nina Petrova (1893–1945), female Red Army sniper credited with 122 kills
Oleg Petrov
Oleg Petrov (b. 1971), Russian hockey player
Oleg Petrov (footballer) (b. 1968), retired Russian professional footballer
Oleh Petrov (1960–2023), Ukrainian politician
Olga Petrova (1884–1977), stage name of Muriel Harding, an English-born American vaudeville performer
Osip Petrov (1806–1878), Russian opera singer
Petar Petrov, several people
Pyotr Nikolayevich Petrov (18271891), Russian historian and writer
Pyotr Mikhailovich Petrov (19101941), Soviet flying ace
Serhiy Petrov (b. 1997), Ukrainian footballer
Stanislav Petrov (1939–2017), Russian colonel who averted a potential nuclear exchange
Stefka Petrova (b. 1950), Bulgarian nutritionist
Stiliyan Petrov (b. 1979), Bulgarian footballer
Tetiana Petrova
Tatiana Petrova (b. 1973), Russian water polo player
Tatyana Petrova (b. 1983), Russian runner
Todor Petrov (b. 1960), Macedonian politician
Tonka Petrova, Bulgarian middle-distance runner
Totka Petrova (b. 1956), Bulgarian middle-distance runner
Tudor Petrov-Popa (b. 1963), Moldovan Romanian politician
Vadim Petrov (1932–2020), Czech composer
Vadym Petrov, (b. 1995) Ukrainian football player
Valeri Petrov (1920–2014), Bulgarian poet
Valeriy Petrov, (1955–2022) Ukrainian football coach
Vasily Petrov, multiple people
Victor Petrov, Soviet spy, Ukrainian emigrant activist, writer, philosopher and historian
Vitaliy Petrov
Vitaly Petrov, Russian auto racing driver
Vitaly Petrov, Ukrainian athletics coach
Vladimir Petrov, multiple people
Vyacheslav Petrov (b. 1969), Russian politician
Yevgeny Petrov, multiple people

Fictional Characters
 Viktor Petrov, the fictional President of Russia in the Netflix series House of Cards. 
Katerina Petrova, (1473-2012) character from the television series The Vampire Diaries
Nadia Petrova, (1490-2012) character from the television series The Vampire Diaries
 Guardian Alberta Petrov, character from the book series Vampire Academy
 Katya Petrova, character from the television series Melrose Place
 Petrova Fossil, character from the novel Ballet Shoes (novel) by Noel Streatfeild

See also
Petrov (disambiguation)

Patronymic surnames
Bulgarian-language surnames
Russian-language surnames
Surnames from given names